Cihan Tasdelen (born 6 June 1975) is a German football manager, currently managing Preußen Münster U19.

Managerial career
Tasdelen started his managerial career in 1995 as a coach for İstanbulspor. In 2000, he joined the youth team of Preußen Münster, and 2007 he became the second team manager until 2011. In 2013, he returned as the youth team manager. In October 2016, Tasdelen became the interim manager of the first team, playing in the 3. Liga, after Horst Steffen had been sacked. He managed two matches for the club, the first being a 7–0 win in the Westphalian Cup against fifth-division side SpVgg Erkenschwick on 9 October 2016. His second and final match was in the 3. Liga against Wehen Wiesbaden on 15 October, which finished as 2–2 draw. After the second match, Benno Möhlmann was announced as Münster's permanent manager.

References

External links
 

1975 births
Living people
German footballers
German football managers
Sportspeople from Hamm
3. Liga managers
Association football defenders
Footballers from North Rhine-Westphalia